Severo E. Colberg Ramírez  (September 16, 1924 – December 26, 1990) was a Puerto Rican politician. He served as a member of the Puerto Rico House of Representatives, and was the Speaker from 1982 to 1985. He was affiliated to the Popular Democratic Party (PPD).

Early years and studies

Colberg Ramírez was born in Cabo Rojo on September 16, 1924. He received his bachelor's degree in social science from the University of Puerto Rico, and his master's degree in public administration from Harvard University. He worked at the University of Puerto Rico as an aide to the Dean of Administration, and as a professor and director at the Graduate School of Public Administration. Colberg Ramirez contributed as columnist for more than 20 years for several of the island's main newspapers. A selected collection of his writings was published by the House of Representatives in 2001.

Political career

Colberg Ramírez was first elected to the Puerto Rico House of Representatives in 1964. He remained in that position until 1968. In 1969, he went on to occupy a seat in the Senate of Puerto Rico, filling a vacancy left by Rafael Durand Manzanal. That same year, he served as Secretary of the Senate and presided the Commission of Treasury until 1972.

In 1972, he ran again for the House of Representatives at the general election. After being elected, he served as president pro tempore of the House. He was again reelected at the 1976 general elections, and was appointed as Minority Speaker for his party. In 1982, he was elected Speaker of the House of Representatives. He served as such until 1984.

Personal life

Colberg Ramírez was married to Eva Toro Fránquiz (b. 1925), also from Cabo Rojo. They had six children: Yanira (b. 1951), Severo (b. 1953), Eva (b. 1955), Esther (b. 1961), Nelson (b. 1963), and Jorge (b. 1965). Their son, Severo Colberg Toro, was a member of the House of Representatives with the PPD from 1993 to 2004. The youngest son, Jorge Colberg Toro, was also elected as a member of the House of Representatives with the PPD from 2008 to 2012. Another notable member of his family was his cousin Dr. Rebekah Colberg, known as "The Mother of Women's Sports in Puerto Rico". Colberg Ramírez died on December 26, 1990, in the city of Bayamón and was buried at the Buxeda Memorial Park in San Juan, Puerto Rico. Eva Toro Fránquiz died on August 2, 2006 at the age of 81.

See also

List of Puerto Ricans

Notes

References

|-

External links
Severo Colberg Ramírez on SenadoPR

1924 births
1990 deaths
20th-century American politicians
Harvard Kennedy School alumni
Popular Democratic Party members of the House of Representatives of Puerto Rico
Speakers of the House of Representatives of Puerto Rico
Members of the Senate of Puerto Rico
People from Cabo Rojo, Puerto Rico
United States Army Air Forces soldiers
University of Puerto Rico alumni
University of Puerto Rico faculty
United States Army Air Forces personnel of World War II